The R417 road is a regional road in Ireland, which runs north-south from the R445 in Monasterevin, County Kildare to the R448 in Carlow, County Carlow.

En route it crosses the N78 National secondary road in the town of Athy, and also the N80 at the north of Carlow town.

See also
Roads in Ireland
National primary road
National secondary road

References
Roads Act 1993 (Classification of Regional Roads) Order 2006 – Department of Transport

Regional roads in the Republic of Ireland
Roads in County Kildare
Roads in County Carlow